Franco Ferreiro and Harsh Mankad were the defending champions but decided not to participate.

Colin Ebelthite and Adam Feeney won in the all-Australian final, against Rameez Junaid and Sadik Kadir, 6–4, 6–7(5–7), [10–7].

Seeds

Draw

Draw

References
 Main Draw

The Hague Open - Doubles
2011 Doubles